Rangachari or Ranga Chari is one of the Indian names:

 C. R. Rangachari was an Indian fast bowler in Test cricket.
 K. Rangachari was an Indian ethnologist who served as Assistant Superintendent of the Madras museum.
 T. Rangachari was an Indian lawyer, politician, journalist, legislator and Indian independence activist.